Trimethyl borate is the organoboron compound with the formula B(OCH3)3. It is a colourless liquid that burns with a green flame. It is an intermediate in the preparation of sodium borohydride and is a popular reagent in organic chemistry. It is a weak Lewis acid (AN = 23, Gutmann-Beckett method). 

Borate esters are prepared by heating boric acid or related boron oxides with alcohols under conditions where water is removed.

Applications
Trimethyl borate is the main precursor to sodium borohydride by its reaction with sodium hydride:
4 NaH + B(OCH3)3 → NaBH4 + 3 NaOCH3

It is a gaseous anti-oxidant in brazing and solder flux. Otherwise, trimethyl borate has no announced commercial applications. It has been explored as a fire retardant, as well as being examined as an additive to some polymers.

Organic synthesis
It is a useful reagent in organic synthesis, as a precursor to boronic acids, which are used in Suzuki couplings. These boronic acids are prepared via reaction of the trimethyl borate with Grignard reagents followed by hydrolysis:.
 ArMgBr + B(OCH3)3 → MgBrOCH3 + ArB(OCH3)2
ArB(OCH3)2 + 2 H2O → ArB(OH)2 + 2 HOCH3

References

External links
National Pollutant Inventory - Boron and compounds
MSDS for Trimethyl Borate
WebBook page for BC3H9O3

Methyl esters
Borate esters
Solvents